Blues Everywhere I Go is an album by American folk singer Odetta, released in 1999. It was her first new release in more than a decade.

Allmusic said in their review: "... time doesn't appear to have affected her interpretive skills or the range and quality of her voice, which remains one of the most remarkable instruments in American folk and blues music to date."

Blues Everywhere I Go was nominated for a Grammy Award for Best Traditional Blues Album at the 42nd Grammy Awards. It was her first nomination after over 50 years of recording.

Track listing 
 "Blues Everywhere I Go" (Scott Shirley) – 4:53
 "Please Send Me Someone to Love" (Percy Mayfield) – 2:33
 "Dink's Blues" (Dink Johnson) – 4:48
 "Unemployment Blues" – 4:05
 "TB Blues" (Victoria Spivey) –  4:06
 "Trouble Everywhere/I've Been Living With the Blues" (Brownie McGhee, Wallace) – 4:01
 "Can't Afford to Lose My Man" (Ernest Lawlars) – 2:56
 "Homeless Blues" (Porter Grainger) – 5:58
 "Oh, Papa" (Davide Elman) – 3:01
 "Look the World Over" (Lawlars) – 3:37
 "Careless Love/St. Louis Blues" (Handy, Koenig, Lead Belly) – 7:50
 "Hear Me Talking to You" – 3:15
 "Rich Man Blues" (Lowe) – 4:41
 "W.P.A. Blues" (Big Bill Broonzy) – 4:12
 "You Gotta Know How" (Sippie Wallace) – 3:38

Personnel 
 Odetta – vocals, guitar
 Jimmy Vivino - guitar
 Dr. John – piano, vocals on "Please Send Me Someone to Love" and "Oh Papa"
 Mike Merritt - acoustic bass
 Paul Ossola – acoustic bass
 Shawn Pelton – drums
 Larry Eagle – drums
 Richard Crooks - drums
 Seth Farber – piano
 Tom "Bones" Malone – tenor saxophone, trumpet on "Dink's Blues"

Production notes 
 Produced and arranged by Seth Farber
 Engineered by Fred Guarino
 Photography by Robert Corwin

References 

1999 albums
Odetta albums